Siede is a river of Lower Saxony, Germany. It runs mainly through the southern part of the district of Diepholz and belongs to the Weser river system.

Course 
The Siede emerges near Reihausen in the village of Engeln in the parish of Bruchhausen-Vilsen. From its source, it flows in a southerly direction through the Samtgemeinde Siedenburg and its main municipality Siedenburg, to which it has given its name. It then leaves Diepholz district and discharges into the Große Aue in the district of Nienburg.

See also
List of rivers of Lower Saxony

References

Rivers of Lower Saxony
Rivers of Germany